Sharypovo is the name of several inhabited localities in Russia.

Modern localities
Urban localities
Sharypovo, Krasnoyarsk Krai, a town in Krasnoyarsk Krai

Rural localities
Sharypovo, Nizhny Novgorod Oblast, a village in Brilyakovsky Selsoviet of Gorodetsky District in Nizhny Novgorod Oblast

Alternative names
Sharypovo, alternative name of Sharipovo, a selo in Sharipovsky Selsoviet of Almenevsky District in Kurgan Oblast;